Purity Kategaya Wako is a Ugandan transformational coach, nutritionist and activist.A member of International coach federation and the of C.E.O KweraBits. Also appeared on the list of BBC 100 influential women in the world 2019.She is Married to Joseph Elisha Wako and a mother of three. 
Purity was born in Ibanda She currently lives in Kampala.

As a modern senga, she advises women on relationships, but expands the role, wanting African women to have equal rights in marriage. She founded her own company, KweraBITS for women's health, beauty and counselling, in 2013 and she has transformed thousands of lives especially women.

In 2019, she was listed among the BBC's 100 Women, a list of 100 inspiring and influential women.

See also
Women in Uganda

References

Ugandan women activists
21st-century Ugandan businesswomen
21st-century Ugandan businesspeople
BBC 100 Women
Makerere University Business School alumni
People from Ibanda District
People from Kampala
Women nutritionists